Marie-Christine Barrault (born 21 March 1944) is a French actress. She is best known for her performance in Cousin Cousine (1975) for which she was nominated for the Academy Award for Best Actress. In 2010, she released her autobiography, titled This Long Way To Get To You.

Life and career
Marie-Christine Barrault was born in Paris, France, the daughter of Martha (née Valmier) and Max-Henri Barrault. Her parents later divorced. Barrault's father, who worked in the theatre, died while she was a teenager. With no support, her mother was unable to care for her and her brother, Alain. Barrault was raised by her grandmother, Felicite. She was mentored in acting by her aunt and uncle, French performers Jean-Louis Barrault and Madeleine Renaud. They initially did not support her dreams of becoming an actress. She performed in plays in secondary school and then enrolled in an acting conservatory. 

Barrault got her start on television in L'oeuvre (1967). She made her feature film debut in Éric Rohmer's My Night at Maud's (1969). In 1970 Barrault was featured along with Pierre Richard in the comedy film Le Distrait. In 1975 Barrault starred in Cousin Cousine, for which she received an Academy Award nomination for Best Actress in a Leading Role. She worked with Rohmer once again in 1978, in the role of Guinevere in Perceval le Gallois and she also has a cameo in his Chloe in the Afternoon.

Barrault is not fluent in English and therefore has generally turned down offers to appear in English-language films. However, in 1980 she accepted an offer from Woody Allen to appear in his film Stardust Memories. In 1988 she was nominated for a Genie Award for her performance in No Blame. In 1991 she portrayed Marie Curie in a television mini-series. In her later career, she has preferred acting on the stage in France. In 2015, she came to Los Angeles on tour to perform in the play Les Yeux Ouverts, in which she portrays French author Marguerite Yourcenar.

Barrault's first husband was producer Daniel Toscan du Plantier, whom she married in 1965. With him, she had two children, David and Ariane. Barrault was married to director Roger Vadim from 1990 until his death from cancer in 2000. She herself is a breast cancer survivor.

Select filmography

 L'oeuvre (1967, TV movie) Christine
 My Night at Maud's (1969) Françoise
 Lancelot of the Lake (1970, TV movie) La reine Guenièvre
 Le distrait (1970) Lisa Gastier
 Le misanthrope (1971, TV movie) Célimène
 Les papiers d'Aspern (1971, TV movie) Hélène Prest
 Le sagouin (1972, TV movie) Léone
 Figaro-ci, Figaro-là (1972, TV movie) Julie
 Love in the Afternoon (1972) Dream Sequence
 Les intrus (1972) Françoise
 Histoire vraie (1973, TV movie) Rose
 L'enlèvement (1973, TV movie) Marie-Josèphe
 Le tour d'écrou (1974, TV movie) Miss Jessel
 La famille Grossfelder (1974, TV movie) Marie-Louise en 1930
 La confession d'un enfant du siècle (1974, TV movie) Brigitte
 John Glückstadt (1975) Hanna Hansen
 Cousin Cousine (1975) Marthe
 By the Tennis Courts (1976) Marie-Christine
 Le chandelier (1977, TV movie) Jacqueline
 The Medusa Touch (1978) Patricia
 The Savage State (1978) Laurence
 Perceval le Gallois (1978) La Reine Guenevievre
 Woman Between Wolf and Dog (1979) Lieve
 Vestire gli ignudi (1979, TV movie) Ersilia
 The Wonderful Adventures of Nils (1980, TV series) Narrator
 My Dearest (1980) Jeanne
 Petit déjeuner compris (1980, TV mini-series) Marie-Louise Leroux
 Même les mômes ont du vague à l'âme (1980) Eva
 Stardust Memories (1980) Isobel
 L'amour trop fort (1981) Rose-Marie de Boisel
 Après tout ce qu'on a fait pour toi (1982, TV movie) Jeanne
 Le village sur la colline (1982, TV mini-series) Mme de Cheilly
 Mir reicht's – ich steig aus (1983)
 Table for Five (1983) Marie
 A Love in Germany (1983) Maria Wyler
 Les mots pour le dire (1983) Eliane
 Orpheus (1983, TV movie) La mort
 Swann in Love (1984) Madame Verdurin
 Pianoforte (1984) La mère de Maria
 L'année terrible (1985, TV movie)
 Louise... l'insoumise (1985) Mme Royer
 Le passage (1985, TV movie) Rhona
 Je suis à Rio, ne m'attends pas pour dîner (1985, TV movie) Constance
 A Better Life (1985) La mère de Véronique
 Power of Evil (1985) Sylvie
 Le soulier de satin (1985) La lune
 L'été 36 (1986, TV movie) Lise

 Vaudeville (1986) Madeleine
 The Lizard King (1987, TV movie)
 Manuela's Loves (1987) Manuela
 Bonne fête maman (1987, TV movie) Jeanne Thomas
 No Blame (1988, TV movie) Suzanne
 Daniya, jardín del harem (1988) Almodís
 Adieu je t'aime (1988) Nicole Dupré
 The Abyss (1988) Hilzonde
 Sanguine (1988) Nedie
 Women in Prison (1988) Dessombes
 Une femme tranquille (1989, TV movie) Marianne
 Jesus of Montreal (1989) Dubbing actress
 Un été d'orages (1989) Anne
 Gallant Ladies (1990) Jacquette de Bourdeille
 Moi, général de Gaulle (1990, TV movie) Mme Costal
 L'enfant des loups (1991, TV movie) Leubovère
 Marie Curie, une femme honorable (1991, TV mini-series) Marie Curie
 Necessary Love (1991) Valentina
 Jenny Marx, la femme du diable (1993, TV movie) Jenny Marx
 Amour Fou (1993, TV movie) Louise
 Next Time the Fire (1993) Elena
 Bonsoir (1994) Marie Wileska
 Les maîtresses de mon mari (1995, TV movie) Elisa
 La nouvelle tribu (1996, TV mini-series) Jeanne
 Tendre piège (1996, TV movie) Françoise
 Mon père avait raison (1996, TV movie) Germaine Bellanger
 Un coup de baguette magique (1997, TV movie) Jeanne
 Obsession (1997) Ella Beckmann
 Les braconniers de Belledombre (1997, TV movie) Françoise Sampaing
 Love, Math and Sex (1997) La prof de maths
 Le grand Batre (1997, TV movie) Thérèse
 Maison de famille (1999, TV movie) Françoise Cornier
 The Dilettante (1999) Thérèse Rambert
 Azzurro (2000) Elizabeth Broyer
 Le vieil ours et l'enfant (2001, TV movie) La Duchesse
 Les amants de Mogador (2002)
 Le Don fait à Catchaires (2003, TV movie) Jeanne
 La deuxième vérité (2003, TV movie) Mathilde
 Rêves en France (2003, TV movie) Madame Labourdette
 Droit d'asile (2003, TV movie) Christine
 Saint-Germain ou La négociation (2003, TV movie) Catherine de Médicis
 Parlez-moi d'amour (2005, TV movie) Élisa
 Ange de feu (2006, TV movie) Janine Cordey
 Passés troubles (2006, TV movie) Béatrice
 Trivial (2007) Mélanie Bérangère
 Making Plans for Lena (2009) Annie
 L'Art de la fugue (2014) Nelly
 Shades of Truth (2015) Sister Maria Angelica

References

External links

 
 
 

1944 births
Living people
Actresses from Paris
French film actresses
French television actresses
French National Academy of Dramatic Arts alumni
French stage actresses
20th-century French actresses
21st-century French actresses
Audiobook narrators